Defending champions Andrew Lapthorne and Peter Norfolk defeated David Wagner and Noam Gershony in the final, 6–4, 6–2 to win the quad doubles wheelchair tennis title at the 2012 Australian Open.

Seeds
  Andrew Lapthorne /  Peter Norfolk (champions)
  David Wagner /  Noam Gershony (final)

Main draw

Finals

References
 Main Draw

Wheelchair Quad Doubles
2012 Quad Doubles